Oreisplanus is a genus of skipper butterflies in the family Hesperiidae.

Species
Oreisplanus munionga Olliff, 1890
Oreisplanus perornata Kirby, 1893

References
Natural History Museum Lepidoptera genus database
Oreisplanus at funet

Trapezitinae
Hesperiidae genera